Ezequiel Lázaro (born 4 December 1981) was an Argentine footballer.

References
 Profile at BDFA 
 

1985 births
Living people
Argentine footballers
Argentine expatriate footballers
Atlético de Rafaela footballers
Chacarita Juniors footballers
Talleres de Córdoba footballers
Instituto footballers
Ñublense footballers
Expatriate footballers in Chile
Association football midfielders
Footballers from Córdoba, Argentina
Pan American Games gold medalists for Argentina
Footballers at the 2003 Pan American Games
Pan American Games medalists in football
Medalists at the 2003 Pan American Games